Örgryte Idrottssällskap, commonly referred to as Örgryte IS, Örgryte or (especially locally) ÖIS or Öis, is a Swedish sports club based in Gothenburg. It consists of four departments, namely bowling, football, athletics and wrestling. However, the club is best known for its football department. It is the oldest football club in Sweden. The club was founded in 1887 which makes it the oldest active sports club in the country.

History

The club was founded on 4 December 1887 by Willhem Friberg and participated in the first football match in Sweden on 22 May 1892. Today, a memorial on Heden in central Gothenburg reminiscent of this match. Another memorial has been erected inside the amusement park Liseberg. Örgryte IS came to dominate the childhood of Swedish football. In 1904 Örgyte IS met a friendly match between the English Corinthian FC, thanks for the hospitality donated a silver cup – Corinthian Bowl that next year became the prize in a contest between Sweden's best teams.

In 1908 Örgyte IS officially opened its facility Walhalla stadium. Hugo Levin, football player and the secretary of Örgyte IS, was one of many involved in the building of Walhalla and had several positions in Gothenburg football. Walhalla was inaugurated by a match between Örgryte and German champions Viktoria Berlin. Between 1910–1924 Örgryte IS played in the Swedish series, a series that lacked national status despite participation by leading teams. Öis won the series in 1910, 1912 and 1924 the team won the 1924 Western series, and then the final against AIK. Player Sven Rydell who became Sweden's first major football star and became known for his fast play and creative dribbling, but above all for his ability to score. Carl-Erik Holmberg was a contributor to its success, with its total of 193 goals in the Swedish League for Örgryte IS. 1926 the team celebrated a major success when beating Aston Villa 5–2, which was unusual.

In the first decades of the 20th century, Örgryte IS also played bandy. The club became Gothenburg district champions in this sport in 1917.

In the late 1930s the fortunes began to decline for the team. They finished 10th out of 12 teams in both 1938 and 1939, and avoided relegation. In 1940 Örgyte IS relegated from allsvenskan to Division II Västra.
During the 1940s and 1950s the team played in Division 2 but would enjoy greater success in the 1950s. Örgryte attracted record crowds despite the low status in the second division. The team recruited Gunnar Gren and in  1956 he becomes the player-coach for the offensive teams that attract large crowds to ÖIS matches. In 1958 the team is becoming more competitive.  A young player in the team of this era was Agne Simonsson who later will go on to play in the Swedish National Football Team.

Örgryte IS has won 12 national championship titles and one national cup title. After having economical problems Örgryte Fotboll AB went into bankruptcy in February 2011. The upshot of the bankruptcy was that Örgryte was relegated to the third Swedish division, Division 1 Södra.  Their home arena is Gamla Ullevi. The club is affiliated to the Göteborgs Fotbollförbund.

In 2007 the youth part of the football section started to accept girls as well as boys after the men's section having been active for 120 years.

Örgryte IS played for a long time in red shirts and blue shorts, but in 2018 they went back to using their older claret shirts.

Supporters

The name of the official supporter club is ÖIS Supporterklubb Balders Hage. There are also other groups of fans. The second largest supporter group is the Ultras-influenced Inferno Örgryte.

According to a recent survey, Örgryte IS is the third most popular team in Gothenburg, with 11% of the football fans supporting them. The other local teams with a notable following are IFK Göteborg, GAIS and BK Häcken.

Notable fans of the club include Marcus and Peter Birro, Weiron Holmberg, Fredrik Ohlsson, Björn Afzelius and Leif Pagrotsky.

Rivalries

The strongest rivalry is with IFK Göteborg, also from Gothenburg. The derbies between the two teams have attracted some of the highest attendance in Swedish football. The fixture attracted 52,194 spectators in 1959, an all time Allsvenskan record. The other big rivalry is with GAIS.

Players

First-team squad

Retired numbers
4 – Niclas Sjöstedt, defender (1987–2000)

Achievements
 Swedish Champions
 Winners (12): 1896, 1897, 1898, 1899, 1902, 1904, 1905, 1906, 1907, 1909, 1913, 1985

League
 Allsvenskan:
 Winners (2): 1925–26, 1927–28
Play-off winners (1): 1985
 Runners-up (2): 1928–29, 1931–32
 Svenska Serien:
 Winners (4): 1910, 1911–12, 1920–21, 1923–24
 Runners-up (3): 1912–13, 1913–14, 1916–17
 Superettan:
 Winners (1): 2008
 Division 1 Södra:
 Winners (2): 1994, 2012
 Runners-up (2): 2014, 2015
 Division 1 Västra:
 Runners-up (1): 1991
 Fyrkantserien:
 Runners-up (2): 1918, 1919

Cups
 Svenska Cupen:
 Winners (1): 1999–2000
 Runners-up (1): 1997–98
 Svenska Mästerskapet:
 Winners (11): 1896, 1897, 1898, 1899, 1902, 1904, 1905, 1906, 1907, 1909, 1913
 Runners-up (5): 1897 (reserve team), 1900, 1901 (reserve team), 1912, 1915
 Corinthian Bowl:
 Winners (7): 1906, 1907, 1908, 1909, 1911, 1912, 1913
 Runners-up (1): 1910
 Svenska Fotbollspokalen:
 Winners (2): 1903 I, 1903 II

See also
List of Örgryte IS players

Footnotes

References

External links
 Official website
 ÖIS Supporterklubb Balders Hage – official supporter club site

 
Football clubs in Gothenburg
Allsvenskan clubs
Association football clubs established in 1887
Bandy clubs established in 1887
Sports clubs in Gothenburg
1887 establishments in Sweden
Football clubs in Västra Götaland County
Svenska Cupen winners